Antônio Matias (10 April 1963 – 3 January 2008) was a Portuguese judoka.

After retiring he became a coach, for Nuno Delgado and Telma Monteiro among others.

Achievements

References

External links

News on death 

1963 births
2008 deaths
Portuguese male judoka
Olympic judoka of Portugal
Judoka at the 1992 Summer Olympics
20th-century Portuguese people